Haijian 52 is a China Marine Surveillance ship in the 5th Marine Surveillance Flotilla of the East China Sea Fleet. Originally christened as "Shijian" and commissioned in 1967 as a comprehensive oceanic survey vessel, Haijian 52 joined CMS, East China Sea Fleet in 2000. It was planned to be inactive in 2007 but her service was extended.

References

Ships of the China Marine Surveillance